Ecolog International is a multinational company that uses technology and supply chain management to provide services for a variety of industries including energy, construction, facility management and the environment. Ecolog is headquartered in Dubai, United Arab Emirates. With local presence in 5 continents, the company has operations in more than 30 countries and over 150 locations worldwide.

History
Ecolog International was founded in 1999 by Nazif Destani after discovering German soldiers conducting a NATO engagement for the KFOR mission lacked proper laundry services. The company started with laundry services for the German forces (Bundeswehr) and expanded into a wide variety of services to government, commercial entities and non-profit organizations. By 2005, the company established a headquarters in Dusseldorf, Germany, and reached €131 million in sales. In 2007, Destani stepped down from managing day-to-day operations of Ecolog but maintained oversight as the chairman of the company. Destani was succeeded as CEO by António Gonçalves, Paul Broekhuijesen, Adil Toubia in 2017, and, Ali Vezvaei mid 2019 and Andy Vargoczky early 2022 .

Operations
Ecolog International's infrastructure includes air service, logistics, fuel, water, catering, storage, construction, industrial services and facility management, disinfection and cleaning, laundry, mobile lavatories, energy supply and waste management, all of which are widely used by oil and gas and mining operations as well as government and defence contractors, humanitarian and non-governmental organizations (NGO), including the United Nations. The company has been contracted to work with the Royal Dutch Shell, Samsung, Petronas, Weatherford International, and Qatar Gas, as well as the U.S. Army, the United Nations, the UK Ministry of Defence, the Bundeswehr, NATO and the French Army. The company operates under the guidelines set by the ISO9001, ISO14001, and OHSAS 18001 ISO Certifications. Ecolog underwent a due diligence process in 2018 and was certified by Trace International and is a supporter of the ten principles of the United Nations’ Global Compact by adopting sustainable and socially responsible policies on human rights, labor, environment and anti-corruption.

The company has established several partnerships and portfolio expansions since mid-2019, including establishing its new Eco-Care Solution in response to the COVID-19 pandemic as well Ecolog Energy Solution as its water and power divisions focused on harnessing the most abundant resources, seawater and sunshine.

Corporate leadership
In mid-2019, oil and gas executive Ali Vezvaei joined Ecolog International as the group CEO and the CEO of the management board.

Philanthropy
Ecolog partnered with the United States Agency for International Development Small Business Expansion Project to launch the Support Fund For Women and Youth Entrepreneurs in 2014 to create more jobs in the Polog region of North Macedonia. In March 2017, the company partnered with the German Embassy to donate a variety of trees to the Center for Culture in Tetovo, Macedonia. In December 2018, the company donated computers to create a computer lab at the University of Bangui in the Central African Republic. Ecolog donated mobile school facilities in the Al Nasr community, Iraq, located 50 km away from Baghdad.

On 26 November 2019, northwestern Albania was struck by a powerful earthquake that killed and injured many citizens. Ecolog responded by offering transportation and donating supplies to rescue workers. In April 2020, the company donated thousands of electronic devices to students in various parts of North Macedonia to support distance learning in the wake of the COVID-19 pandemic.

Sponsorships
Since 2013, the company has sponsored KF Shkëndija football club in Tetovo, North Macedonia. In 2016, the company took the club's home stadium, Tetovo City Stadium, under concession and renovated the stadium including adding seating and floodlights that enabled the stadium to host international matches. The stadium was renamed Ecolog Arena in July 2016.

Criticisms
Between 2006 and 2009, the German press raised concerns about the company's use of a laundry detergent that gave German soldier's uniforms a pink tint (visible at night), as well as issues with black water and diesel fuel. The matter was investigated by Ecolog in conjunction with Germany's Ministry of Defense, which determined that the issues were minor and had been resolved.

In 2017, the company terminated the driver who was found to have accepted bribes to transport civilians in the Central African republic.

Awards and recognition
In 2019, the company publicized its Communication on Progress of its commitments to the UN Global Compact. The company received a gold award from the Royal Society for the Prevention of Accidents (RoSPA) in 2017 and 2018 for its safety and security protocols. It was also recognised by RoSPA with the gold award in 2020.

References

External links
ND Group website

German companies established in 1998